XHLAC can refer to two stations, both in Lázaro Cárdenas, Michoacán:

XHLAC-FM 107.9, "Radio Azul"
XHLAC-TV channel 11, transmitter for the Canal 5 network